Louisiana State Route 7 (LA 7) was one of the 98 original state highways that were established in 1924.

Route description

Legislative Highway Report
Beginning on the Mississippi State Line north of Angie through Bogalusa, Covington, Hammond, Albany, Holden, Livingston, Walker, Denham Springs, Baton Rouge, Port Allen, Rosedale, Livonia, Krotz Springs, Port Barre, Opelousas, Eunice, Elton, Kinder, Fulton, De Quincy, Starks, thence to Texas line at or near Deweyville, Texas. - 1924 Louisiana Legislative Route Description

Texas to Krotz Springs
LA 7 began at the Texas state line near Deweyville, crossing the Sabine River on a swing bridge. It ran in a straight line along a railroad through the western part of the state, meeting LA 42/US 171 in Ragley and LA 24/US 165 in Kinder before entering Opelousas. LA 7 met LA 5 in Opelousas, which carried US 167, before meeting US 71 and ending in downtown Krotz Springs.

Lottie to Mississippi
LA 7 was sliced in half with the opening of the Morganza Spillway in the same way that LA 1 was split in half with the opening of the Bonnet Carre Spillway. LA 7 followed the railroad to Livonia, where it met LA 1 and the two were paired to Port Allen. After crossing the Mississippi River in Port Allen, LA 1 turned to the south in Baton Rouge, while LA 7 picked up US 61 and US 190.

US 61 split from LA 7 at a traffic circle, with LA 7 carrying US 190 through the Florida Parishes. US 190 was split from LA 7 in Hammond, where LA 7 met LA 33/US 51. US 190 was paired with US 51 until the 1960s, when US 190 was shifted onto the old LA 7 alignment. LA 7 then passed through Covington and Bogalusa before ending at the Mississippi state line.

Auxiliary routes of LA 7
LA 7-X, covering the multiple special routes of LA 7.

Major intersections

References
Louisiana Maps from 1955
Google Earth

Former state highways in Louisiana